Ballal Dhipi is a historic archeological site on the eastern flood plain of the Hooghly in Nadia, West Bengal, a few kilometres east of Nabadwip. The remains date back to the 12th century AD and earlier. A 30-ft structure of solid terracotta bricks is spread over an area of 1,300 sq ft. with a floor made of lime and sand. It is named after Ballala Sena (1160-1179) of the Sena dynasty.  

Archaeologists have found traces of a temple complex. Historians differ on the origin of the structure. It may be the ruin of a Buddhist stupa or vihar, possibly built between the 11th and 13th centuries. It has similarities with Vikramshila Vihar, in Bihar and Shompur Vihar, in Rajshahi, Bangladesh. It may also be a part of the capital of the Sena dynasty.

Geography

Location
Ballal Dhipi is located at Bamunpukur, near Mayapur and Nabadwip, .

Note: The map alongside presents some of the notable locations in the subdivision. All places marked in the map are linked in the larger full screen map.

Excavations
The Kolkata Circle of the Archaeological Survey of India excavated the mound, during 1982-1988, and "exposed huge brick structures and various antiquities datable to c. 10th to 12th cent. AD. The brick structure include shrines on sides and a massive construction within an enclosure." The antiquities indicate the possibility of Buddhist affiliation. The structural complex covers nearly 13,000 m2. Experts opine the "stupa(vihara) of eighth/ ninth century was perhaps a seat of learning and pilgrimage up to the end of the 11th century." It is about 25 km from Krishnanagar.

The ASI has divided the site into two parts – the mound and the remains of a fort. Both the sites are identified as an ASI listed monument.

Ballal Dhipi picture gallery

References

External links

Monuments of National Importance in West Bengal
Former populated places in India
Archaeological sites in West Bengal
Nadia district